Luny Unold (30 June 1920 – 15 October 2010) was a Swiss figure skater. She competed in the pairs event at the 1948 Winter Olympics.

References

External links
 

1920 births
2010 deaths
Swiss female pair skaters
Olympic figure skaters of Switzerland
Figure skaters at the 1948 Winter Olympics
Sportspeople from Basel-Stadt
20th-century Swiss women